Alleanza Securitas Esperia, also known as Allsecures, was an Italian insurance company. It was formed in Rome in 1933 by a merger of Alleanza & Unione Mediterranea with Securitas Esperia, a part of the Assicurazioni Generali group. In 1965 it was the thirtieth Italian insurance company by total insurance premiums. It was merged into the Axa group in 1998.

References

Defunct insurance companies of Italy
Financial services companies established in 1933
Italian companies established in 1933
Financial services companies disestablished in 1998
Italian companies disestablished in 1998
Axa